The Municipality of Preddvor is a municipality in Slovenia. The seat of the municipality is the town of Preddvor. The municipality was established on 3 October 1994, when the former larger Municipality of Kranj was subdivided into the municipalities of Cerklje na Gorenjskem, Kranj, Naklo, Preddvor, and Šenčur. The municipality was reduced in size on 7 August 1998 by the creation of the Municipality of Jezersko from its territory.

Settlements
In addition to the municipal seat of Preddvor, the municipality also includes the following settlements:

 Bašelj
 Breg ob Kokri
 Hraše pri Preddvoru
 Hrib
 Kokra
 Mače
 Možjanca
 Nova Vas
 Potoče
 Spodnja Bela
 Srednja Bela
 Tupaliče
 Zgornja Bela

References

External links
 
Municipality of Preddvor on Geopedia
Municipality of Preddvor website 

 
1994 establishments in Slovenia
Preddvor